Protapion is a genus of beetles belonging to the family Apionidae.

The species of this genus are found in Europe and Africa.

Species:
 Protapion angusticolle (Gyllenhal, 1833) 
 Protapion apricans (Herbst, 1797)

References

Brentidae